The 2022 Syrian local elections were held on 18 September 2022. Positions in all 14 governorates, 158 cities, 572 towns and 726 municipalities were up for election.

References 

September 2022 events in Syria
2022 in Syria
2020s in Syrian politics
Local elections in Syria